Adelonema wallisii (synonym Homalomena wallisii ) is a species of flowering plant in the family Araceae native to Venezuela, Colombia, and Panama.

It reaches about 6" (15 cm) in height but with a much wider spread. The leaf blades are elliptic to ovate-oblong in shape about 5 - 8" (13 – 20 cm) in length, on rather short stalks, arching or recurving, bright-green with a markings of a marbled yellow. It can be confused with the rather similar Aglaonema.

References

External links
Gardentia

Aroideae
Flora of Panama
Flora of Colombia
Flora of Venezuela
Plants described in 1877
House plants